Trace Lake is a lake in Todd County, in the U.S. state of Minnesota.

Trace Lake was named for Ferdinand Trace, a pioneer who settled there.

See also
List of lakes in Minnesota

References

Lakes of Minnesota
Lakes of Todd County, Minnesota